The 1942–43 Gauliga Donau-Alpenland was the fifth season of the Gauliga Donau-Alpenland, formerly the Gauliga Ostmark, the first tier of football in German-annexed Austria from 1938 to 1945.

First Vienna FC won the championship and qualified for the 1943 German football championship, reaching the semi-finals where it lost 2–1 to FV Saarbrücken.

The 1942–43 season saw the ninth edition of the Tschammerpokal, now the DFB-Pokal. The 1943 edition was won by First Vienna FC, defeating Luftwaffe team LSV Hamburg 3–2 after extra time on 31 October 1943.

The Gauliga Ostmark and Gauliga Donau-Alpenland titles from 1938 to 1944, excluding the 1944–45 season which was not completed, are recognised as official Austrian football championships by the Austrian Bundesliga.

Table
The 1942–43 season saw two new clubs in the league, Wiener AC and Reichsbahn SG Wien.

Results

References

External links
 Das Deutsche Fussball Archiv  Historic German league tables

Gauliga Ostmark seasons
Austria
Football
1942–43 in German football leagues